Jean Carol Macpherson Moorhead Duffy (born December 17, 1938) is a former member of the California State Assembly from the 5th district from December 4, 1978 - November 30, 1986. 

1938 births
Living people
University of California alumni
University of California, Berkeley alumni
Stanford University alumni
San Jose State University alumni
Democratic Party members of the California State Assembly
American nurses
American women nurses
21st-century American women